The 1944 CCNY Beavers football team was an American football team that represented the City College of New York (CCNY) as an independent during the 1944 college football season. In their second season under head coach Leo Miller, the team compiled an 0–7 record.

Schedule

References

CCNY
CCNY Beavers football seasons
College football winless seasons
CCNY Beavers football